Acacia uncifera is a shrub or tree belonging to the genus Acacia and the subgenus Phyllodineae native to north eastern Australia.

Description
It has branchlets that are covered in short velvety hairs. The spherical flower-heads contain 25 to 30 bright golden flowers.

Taxonomy
The species was first formally described by the botanist George Bentham in 1848 as part of Thomas Mitchell's work Journal of an Expedition into the Interior of Tropical Australia. It was reclassified as Racosperma unciferum by Leslie Pedley in 1987 then transferred back to genus Acacia in 2001.

Distribution
It is endemic only in a small area in Queensland from the White Mountains to Torrens Creek and the headwaters of the Nogoa River where it is found on plains and hills where it grows in sandy soils over and around sandstone as a part of open forest or woodland communities composed of Angophora and Eucalyptus species.

See also
 List of Acacia species

References

uncifera
Flora of Queensland
Plants described in 1848
Taxa named by George Bentham